In software development, a bug bash is a procedure where all the developers, testers, program managers, usability researchers, designers, documentation folks, and even sometimes marketing people, put aside their regular day-to-day duties and "pound on the product"—that is, each exercises the product in every way they can think of.  Because each person will use the product in slightly different (or very different) ways, and the product is getting a great deal of use in a short amount of time, this approach may reveal bugs relatively quickly.

The use of bug-bashing sessions is one possible tool in the testing methodology TMap (test management approach). Bug-bashing sessions are usually announced to the organization some days or weeks ahead of time. The test management team may specify that only some parts of the product need testing.  It may give detailed instructions to each participant about how to test, and how to record bugs found.

In some organizations, a bug-bashing session is followed by a party and a prize to the person who finds the worst bug, and/or the person who finds the greatest total of bugs.

Bug Bash is a collaboration event, the step-by-step procedure has been given in the article 'Bug Bash—A Collaboration Episode'.

See also

 Tiger team
 Eat one's own dog food

References

Software engineering folklore
Software testing